Thomas Hylkema (born 20 August  1988) is a Dutch racing driver, who drove for Tech 1 Racing in the GP3 Series in 2011. He is the brother of Bart Hylkema, a British Formula 3 racer.

Career

Like most racing drivers, Hylkema started his career in karting, where he was active until 2005. In 2006 he moved to Touring Car racing, where he was 14th in the BRL Light. Hylkema then moved to Formula Racing. He raced in several Formula Renault championships.

GP3 Series

In 2011 GP3 Series season, Hylkema moved to the GP3 Series. He replaced Andrea Caldarelli at Tech 1 Racing.

Complete GP3 Series results
(key) (Races in bold indicate pole position) (Races in italics indicate fastest lap)

References

1988 births
Living people
Dutch racing drivers
People from Maarn
Manor Motorsport drivers
Tech 1 Racing drivers
Eifelland Racing drivers
Formula BMW ADAC drivers
Dutch GP3 Series drivers
Sportspeople from Utrecht (province)
Mark Burdett Motorsport drivers
British Formula Renault 2.0 drivers
BVM Racing drivers
Fortec Motorsport drivers
21st-century Dutch people